The Mandi, according to Pliny the Elder, are a short-lived people from India. Pliny equates the Mandi, named by Cleitarchus and Megasthenes, whose women can bear children in their seventh year and who become old at forty, with the Macrobii, whose women only have children once in their lives.

See also

 Calingi
 Buddhist eschatology, where a similar short-living race is mentioned.

References 

Medieval European legendary creatures